Peri Sandria (born 23 September 1969) is an Indonesian football player and manager that previously plays for Persib Bandung in the Liga Indonesia Premier Division. He also played for Indonesia national football team in the 1996 Tiger Cup.

Club careers 
Peri Sandria began his career in Galatama with the club KTB Bekasi, shortly before the first national professional competition, the Liga Indonesia.

For the 1994–1995 season began he was transferred to Bandung Raya. He gained Indonesia League trophy with Bandung Raya in 1995–96 season and runner-up in the next season. He also won the top scorer with 34 goals scored in the first edition of Liga Indonesia.

Following consistent success there, when Bandung Raya's folded in 1998 he joined one of the major Bandung clubs, Persib Bandung and he retired in lower division club.

International career 
He received his first international cap in 1991 and retired from the Indonesia national football team in 1996, appearing in 7 matches.

Peri Sandria scored the first goal for Indonesia in the 1996 Tiger Cup tournament against Laos.

International goals

Honours

Clubs 
Diklat Ragunan :
Asian Cup for Student : 3 (1987, 1988, 1989)
Bandung Raya :
Liga Indonesia Premier Division champion : 1 (1995–96)
Liga Indonesia Premier Division runner-up : 1 (1996–97)

National teams 
SEA Games Gold medal : 1 (1991)

Individual 
Liga Indonesia Premier Division top-scorer : 1 (34 goals; 1994–95)

References 

1969 births
Association football forwards
Living people
Indonesian footballers
Indonesia international footballers
Indonesian football managers
KTB Bekasi players
Bandung Raya players
Persib Bandung players
Persikabo Bogor players
Indonesian Premier Division players
Southeast Asian Games gold medalists for Indonesia
Southeast Asian Games medalists in football
Competitors at the 1991 Southeast Asian Games
People from Binjai
Sportspeople from North Sumatra